Gibbula tantilla is a species of sea snail, a marine gastropod mollusk in the family Trochidae, the top snails.

In 1991 Smriglio, Mariottini & Gravina, designated a lectotype and figure. They recognized Gibbula tantilla as a valid species, but considered it as possibly extinct.

Description
The shell is similar to the shell of Gibbula racketti. It contains six tumid whorls. The aperture is subquadrate. The base of the shell is rounded. The umbilicus is reduced to a small hole.

Distribution
This species occurs in the Mediterranean Sea off Sicily.

References

External links

tantilla
Gastropods described in 1890